The national flag of Fiji (Fijian: kuila ni Viti) was adopted on 10 October 1970. The state arms have been slightly modified but the flag has remained the same as during Fiji's colonial period. It is a defaced cyan "Blue Ensign" (the actual Blue Ensign version of the flag is the Government ensign), with the shield from the national coat of arms. It has remained unchanged since Fiji was declared a republic in 1987, despite calls from some politicians for changes.

A plan to change the flag, announced by Prime Minister Frank Bainimarama in 2013, was abandoned in August 2016.

Design

The flag's bright blue background symbolizes the Pacific Ocean, which plays an important part in the lives of the islanders, both in terms of the fishing industry, and the huge tourist trade. The Union Jack reflects the country's links with the United Kingdom. The shield is derived from the country's coat of arms, which was granted by Royal Warrant in 1908. It is a white shield with a red cross and a red chief (upper third of a shield). The images depicted on the shield represent agricultural activities on the islands, and the historical associations with the United Kingdom. At the top of the shield, a British lion holds a cocoa pod between its paws. The first quarter is sugar cane, the second quarter is a coconut palm, the third quarter is a dove of peace, and the fourth quarter is a bunch of bananas.

The flag is very similar to the colonial ensign used prior to independence, the main differences being the latter used a darker shade of blue and displayed the entire Fijian coat of arms as opposed to just the shield. While some reformists have called for the removal of the Union Flag, seeing it a British colonial emblem, others support its retention for the sake of historical continuity. The flags of five other independent countries (Australia, Cook Islands, New Zealand, Niue, and Tuvalu) retain the Union Flag in their national flags. But of these, only Fiji is a republic. The Union flag also remains on the flag of Hawaii, a U.S. state since 1959.

Some influential Fijians have called for the restoration of the full coat of arms to the flag. On 30 November 2005, Fiji's Great Council of Chiefs called for the two warrior figures, who guard the shield on the coat of arms, to be placed on the flag, along with a miniature canoe and the national motto, Rerevaka na kalou ka doka na tui ("Fear God and honour the Queen") – symbols that were featured on the original flag of the Kingdom of Viti, the first unified Fijian state created under the leadership of Seru Epenisa Cakobau in 1871.

"The coat of arms is very significant because it has the word of God, then it has the two warriors and the Fijian canoe also. I think that the council members prefer that the full coat of arms be included in the Fiji flag," said Asesela Sadole, General Secretary of the Great Council of Chiefs.

Prior to ceding the country to British rule in 1874, the government of Fiji adopted a national flag featuring blue and white vertical stripes, with in the centre a red shield depicting a white dove. This flag ceased to be used when the colonial era began and Fiji relinquished its independence. Fiji was a British colony from 1874 to 1970.

Colour scheme 
Note: as there is no official shade, the blue colour has been variously described as Pantone 2915 C, Pantone 549C and Pantone 298C.

Proposal for a new flag
In his New Year's Day address in 2013, Prime Minister Frank Bainimarama announced that the flag would soon be changed so as "to reflect a sense of national renewal, to reinforce a new Fijian identity and a new confidence in being Fijian on the global stage". The change in the flag would accompany the adoption of a new Constitution, intended by Fiji's military leader (who came to power in a coup in December 2006) to establish a "one person, one vote", non-racial and secular democracy under military oversight. The country, a republic, had removed Queen Elizabeth II from its currency a few weeks earlier.

On 3 February 2015, Bainimarama confirmed that the flag of Fiji would be replaced. He announced that a national competition to design the new flag would be held, with the aim of hoisting this flag on 11 October 2015, the 45th anniversary of independence.

During the competition, over 2,000 designs were submitted, before a final shortlist of 23 was selected by Fiji's National Flag Committee on 9 June 2015. It was intended to submit these designs to the Cabinet for consideration on 30 June 2015, following a brief public feedback period. However, on 30 June, Bainimarama announced that this feedback period was to be extended to 31 December 2015, saying, "(People) want more time to consider what form the new flag should take... By extending the deadline, there is now ample opportunity for Fijians of all ages and backgrounds to further contribute and consider what symbols most appropriately represent our wonderful nation."

On 24 December 2015, the Fijian government announced that it had again put off a decision on the country's new flag via delaying the next stage by another two months to the end of February 2016. In a statement, the government said that it had now received new submissions since it released 23 designs earlier in 2015, and that it was still seeking more. Furthermore, it was announced that five designs would be chosen through the Prime Minister's Office in March 2016, with the public then having three months to select one. The government also said it expected to announce the new flag on 1 July 2016 or at a later date, and that it planned to raise the new flag on Constitution Day, 7 September 2017 (a new public holiday celebrating the 2013 Constitution of Fiji).

However, on 17 August 2016, Bainimarama publicly announced that the government was abandoning plans to change the flag. He read out a statement saying: "While I remain convinced personally that we need to replace some of the flag’s colonial symbols with a genuinely indigenous expression of our present and our future, it has been apparent to the Government since February that the flag should not be changed for the foreseeable future". The flag's popularity had been boosted by the country winning its first ever Olympic gold medal under its banner in the 2016 Summer Olympics. The decision to retain the current flag was welcomed by opposition parties.

Other flags of Fiji

Historical

Pre-colonial era

Colonial era

Proposed flags

2005 proposal

On 30 November 2005, Fiji's Great Council of Chiefs called for the restoration of the country's full Coat of Arms to the flag, including two warrior figures on either side of the shield, along with an outrigger canoe at the top and the national motto, Rerevaka na kalou ka doka na tui ("Fear God and honour the Queen") below it.

2015 proposals

On 3 February 2015, Prime Minister Frank Bainimarama confirmed that the flag of Fiji would be replaced. He announced that a national competition to design the new flag would be held, with the aim of hoisting this flag on 11 October 2015, the 45th anniversary of independence. During the competition, over 2,000 designs were submitted, before a final shortlist of 23 was selected by Fiji's National Flag Committee on 9 June 2015. However, on 17 August 2016, Bainimarama publicly announced that the government was abandoning plans to change the flag. The decision was directly caused by the country winning its first ever olympic gold medal that month, which spurred celebrations using the current flag.

Notes

References

Sources
 High Commission of the Republic of the Fiji Islands to New Zealand – National Symbols of Fiji. "Ensigns for use in Government vessels, in merchant ships and in naval vessels are of the same basic design, but have dark blue, red and white background respectively". Accessed 2 February 2006
 Barraclough, E. M. C. and Crampton, W. G. (1978). Flags of the World. London: Frederick Warne. . P. 209 et seq. "The Civil Air Ensign is like that of Britain, except that it has the shield of Fiji placed on the arm of the cross."

External links
 
 Fiji at Flags Corner
 Fiji's Flag Parade
 Fiji at  hubert-herald.nl
 The Fiji Museum - Cakobau flag
 The Symbolism, History and Future of Fiji’s Flag
 23 (first round) "Finalists" for New Fiji Flag
 

National symbols of Fiji
National flags
Light blue ensigns
Flags introduced in 1970
Fiji